Bill J. Carmody (25 December 1922 – 18 June 2001) was an Australian rules footballer who played for the St Kilda Football Club in the Victorian Football League (VFL).

Notes

External links 

1922 births
2001 deaths
Australian rules footballers from Victoria (Australia)
St Kilda Football Club players